Ian Hunter (13 June 1900 – 22 September 1975) was a Cape Colony-born British actor of stage, film and television.

Biography 

Hunter was born in the Kenilworth area of Cape Town, Cape Colony where he spent his childhood. In his teen years, he and his parents returned to the family in England to live. Sometime between that arrival and the early years of World War I, Hunter began exploring acting. But in 1917, aged  17, he joined the army to serve in France for the remainder of the First World War.

On his return Hunter studied under Elsie Fogerty at the Central School of Speech and Drama, then based in the Royal Albert Hall, London.

Within two years he did indeed make his stage debut. He decided to work in British silent films taking a part in Not for Sale (1924) directed by W.P. Kellino for Stoll Pictures.

Hunter made his first trip to the U.S. because Basil Dean, the British actor and director, was producing Richard Brinsley Sheridan's The School for Scandal at the Knickerbocker Theater. However, the production folded after one performance. It was a more concerted effort with film the next year back in Britain, again with Kellino. He then met the film director Alfred Hitchcock in 1927 and was featured in Hitchcock's The Ring (1927) and stayed for the director's Downhill (US: When Boys Leave Home, 1927) and Easy Virtue (1928), based on the Noël Coward play. By late 1928, he returned to Broadway for only a months run in the original comedy Olympia and stayed in America to work in Hollywood on Syncopation (1929) for RKO, his first sound film.

He returned to London for Dean's thriller Escape (1930). In The Girl from 10th Avenue (1935) with Bette Davis, Hunter made his connection with Warner Bros. But before settling in with them through much of the 1930s, he did three pictures in succession with British director Michael Powell. He then appeared as the Duke in A Midsummer Night's Dream (1935) for Warner Bros. It marked the start of a string of nearly 30 films for the studio. Among the best remembered was his jovial King Richard the Lionheart in The Adventures of Robin Hood (1938). Hunter was also paired in seven movies with Kay Francis between 1935 and 1938.

Hunter appeared in The Little Princess (1939) as Captain Reginald Crewe. And he was the benign guardian angel-like Cambreau in Loew's Strange Cargo (1940) with Clark Gable. He was staying regularly busy in Hollywood until into 1942 when he returned to Britain to serve in the war effort. He appeared once more on Broadway in 1948 and made Edward, My Son (1949) for MGM-British with George Cukor directing and Spencer Tracy and Deborah Kerr in the lead roles. Hunter worked once more for Michael Powell (The Queen's Guards, 1961) and then retired in the middle of that decade after nearly 100 films.

Among dozens of film roles, his best-remembered appearances include That Certain Woman (1937) with Bette Davis, Tower of London (1939, as King Edward IV), and Dr. Jekyll and Mr. Hyde (1941, as Dr. Lanyon).  Hunter returned to the Robin Hood legend in the TV series The Adventures of Robin Hood from 1955 in the recurring role of Sir Richard of the Lea.

His numerous West End roles included appearances in London Life (1924), The High Road (1927), A Song of Sixpence (1930), Good Losers (1931), Can the Leopard...? (1931), Take a Chance (1931), Touch Wood (1934) and South Sea Bubble (1956).

Filmography

 Not for Sale (1924) as Martin Bering
 Confessions (1925) as Charles Oddy
 A Girl of London (1925) as Peter Horniman
 The Ring (1927) as Bob Corby
 Downhill aka When Boys Leave Home (1927) as Archie
 His House in Order (1928) as Hilary Jesson
 Easy Virtue (1928) as The Plaintiff's Counsel
 The Physician (1928) as Dr. Carey
 The Valley of Ghosts (1928) as Andrew McLeod
 The Thoroughbred (1928) as Allen Stockbridge
 Syncopation (1929) as Alexander Winston
 Escape (1930) as Detective
 Cape Forlorn aka The Love Storm (1931) as Gordon Kingsley
 Sally in Our Alley (1931) as George Miles
 The Water Gipsies (1932) as Fred Green
 The Sign of Four aka The Sign of Four: Sherlock Holmes' Greatest Case (1932) as Dr. John H. Watson
 Marry Me (1932) as Robert Hart
 The Man from Toronto (1933) as Fergus Wimbush
 The Silver Spoon (1934) as Captain Watts-Winyard
 Orders Is Orders (1934) as Capt. Harper
 The Church Mouse (1934) as Johnathan Steele
 No Escape (1934) as Jim Brandon
 Something Always Happens (1934) as Peter Middleton
 Death at Broadcasting House aka Death at a Broadcast (1934) as Detective Inspector Gregory
 Lazybones (1935) as Sir Reginald Ford
 The Girl from 10th Avenue (1935) as Geoffrey D. 'Geoff' Sherwood
 The Night of the Party aka The Murder Party (1935) as Guy Kennington
 The Phantom Light (1935) as Jim Pearce
 Jalna (1935) as Renny Whiteoaks
 The Crusades (1935) as Second Knight Pleading to King Richard for Food (uncredited)
 A Midsummer Night's Dream (1935) as Theseus - Duke of Athens
 I Found Stella Parish (1935) as Keith Lockridge
 The Morals of Marcus (1935) as Sir Marcus Ordeyne
 The White Angel (1936) as Reporter Fuller of the London Times
 To Mary - with Love (1936) as Bill Hallam
 The Devil Is a Sissy (1936) as Jay Pierce
 Stolen Holiday (1937) as Anthony Wayne
 Call It a Day (1937) as Roger Hilton
 Another Dawn (1937) as Colonel John Wister
 Confession (1937) as Leonide Kirow
 That Certain Woman (1937) as Lloyd Rogers
 52nd Street (1937) as Rufus Rondell
 The Adventures of Robin Hood (1938) as King Richard the Lion-Heart
 Always Goodbye (1938) as Phillip Marshall
 Secrets of an Actress (1938) as Peter Snowden
 The Sisters (1938) as William Benson
 Comet Over Broadway (1938) as Bert Ballin
 Yes, My Darling Daughter (1939) as Lewis Murray
 The Little Princess (1939) as Captain Crewe
 Broadway Serenade (1939) as Larry Bryant
 Tarzan Finds a Son! (1939) as August Lancing
 Maisie (1939) as Clifford Ames
 Bad Little Angel (1939) as Jm Creighton (Sentinel editor)
 Tower of London (1939) as King Edward IV
 Broadway Melody of 1940 (1940) as Bert C. Matthews
 Strange Cargo (1940) as Cambreau
 Dulcy (1940) as Gordon Daly
 The Long Voyage Home (1940) as Smitty
 Bitter Sweet (1940) as Lord Shayne
 Gallant Sons (1940) as 'Natural' Davis
 Come Live with Me (1941) as Barton Kendrick
 Andy Hardy's Private Secretary (1941) as Steven V. Land
 Ziegfeld Girl (1941) as Geoffrey Collis
 Billy the Kid (1941) as Eric Keating
 Dr. Jekyll and Mr. Hyde (1941) as Dr. John Lanyon
 Smilin' Through (1941) as Reverend Owen Harding
 A Yank at Eton (1942) as Roger Carlton
 It Comes Up Love (1943) as Tom Peabody
 Forever and a Day (1943) as Dexter Pomfret
 Bedelia (1946) as Charlie Carrington
 White Cradle Inn aka High Fury (1947) as Anton
 The White Unicorn aka Milkwhite Unicorn and Bad Sister (1947) as Philip Templar
 Edward, My Son (1949) as Doctor Larry Woodhope
 It Started in Paradise (1952) as Arthur Turner
 Appointment in London aka Raiders in the Sky (1952) as Logan
 The Divine Creatures (1952, TV Movie) as Florent
 Don't Blame the Stork (1954) as Sir George Redway
 Eight O'Clock Walk (1954) as Geoffrey Tanner, Q.C.
 Fire One (1954, TV Movie) as Mr. Dennison
 It's Never Too Late (1954, TV Movie) as Charles Hammond
 The Battle of the River Plate aka Pursuit of the Graf Spee (1956) as Captain Charles Woodhouse - HMS Ajax
 South Sea Bubble (BBC TV 1956) as Sir George Shotter
 Fortune Is a Woman aka She Played with Fire (1957) as Clive Fisher
 Rockets Galore aka Mad Little Island (1958) as Air Commodore Watchorn
 North West Frontier (1959) as Sir John Windham
 The Bulldog Breed (1960) as Adm. Sir Bryanston Blyth
 Doctor Blood's Coffin (1961) as Dr. Robert Blood, Peter's Father
 The Treasure of Monte Cristo (1961) as Colonel Jackson
 The Queen's Guards (1961) as Mr. George Dobbie
 Guns of Darkness (1962) as Dr. Swann
 Kali Yug: Goddess of Vengeance (1963) as Robert Talbot
 Kali-Yug, The Bárbaros's Fury (1963) as Robert Talbot (final film role)

References

External links

Photos of Ian Hunter from The Long Voyage Home by Ned Scott

1900 births
1975 deaths
English male film actors
20th-century English male actors
Male actors from Cape Town
British expatriate male actors in the United States
South African emigrants to the United Kingdom